Jacobean embroidery refers to embroidery styles that flourished in the reign of King James I of England in first quarter of the 17th century.

The term is usually used today to describe a form of crewel embroidery used for furnishing characterized by fanciful plant and animal shapes worked in a variety of stitches with two-ply wool yarn on linen.  Popular motifs in Jacobean embroidery, especially curtains for bed hangings, are the Tree of Life and stylized forests, usually rendered as exotic plants arising from a landscape or terra firma with birds, stags, squirrels, and other familiar animals.

Origins
Early Jacobean embroidery often featured scrolling floral patterns worked in colored silks on linen, a fashion that arose in the earlier Elizabethan era.  Embroidered jackets were fashionable for both men and women in the period 1600-1620, and several of these jackets have survived.

Designs

Often based on tree of life imagery, curving branches with large flowers were a typical design. Early crewel embroideries exclusively used wool thread on linen (modern crewel embroidery encompasses a broader range with the only requirement being extensive use of crewel stitch variations).

Legacy
Jacobean embroidery was carried by British colonists to Colonial America, where it flourished.  The Deerfield embroidery movement of the 1890s revived interest in colonial and Jacobean styles of embroidery.

Gallery

See also

1600–1650 in fashion
Crewel embroidery
Margaret Laton's embroidered jacket
Christopher Shawe
Oes

Notes

References
Christie, Mrs. Archibald (Grace Christie), Embroidery and Tapestry Weaving, London, John Hogg, 1912, online at Project Gutenberg
Fitzwilliam, Ada Wentworth and A. F. Morris Hands, Jacobean Embroidery, Its Forms and Fillings Including Late Tudor, Keegan Paul, 1912

External links

Surviving Jacobean embroidered jacket as the Museum of Costume
Jacobean Embroidery, by Ada Wentworth Fitzwilliam and A. F. Morris Hands, 1912, from Project Gutenberg

English embroidery